Topsail Hill Preserve State Park is a  Florida State Park located in Santa Rosa Beach, ten miles (16 km) east of Destin, off U.S. 98, in northwestern Florida. The address is 7525 W. Scenic Highway 30A.

The park has over three miles of white sand beaches, as well as sand dunes, lakes, unique plant and animal life, and wetlands. It is named for a sand dune which stands nearly 25 feet above sea level. Topsail Hill preserve is home to a variety of animal life, including the endangered Choctawhatchee Beach Mouse.

Topsail Hill Preserve is accessed off U.S.Hwy 98, via two main entrances. The western entrance is served by a gravel paved road and leads to the primary beach access. The eastern entrance is unpaved and generally only accessible by four wheel drive vehicles. This entrance path leads to the northern shore of Lake Campbell, one of the three dune lakes contained within the preserve.

Recreational activities
The park has opportunities for bicycling, birding, fishing, and hiking, and full camping facilities.

External links

Topsail Hill Preserve State Park at Florida State Parks
Coastal Dune Lakes Documentary

Parks in Walton County, Florida
State parks of Florida